Integrin alpha-IIb is a protein that in humans is encoded by the ITGA2B gene. ITGA2B, also known as CD41, encodes integrin alpha chain 2b. Integrins are heterodimeric integral membrane proteins composed of an alpha chain and a beta chain. Alpha chain 2b undergoes post-translational cleavage to yield disulfide-linked light and heavy chains that join with beta 3 to form a fibrinogen receptor expressed in platelets that plays a crucial role in coagulation. Mutations that interfere with this role result in thrombasthenia. At least 38 disease-causing mutations in this gene have been discovered. In addition to adhesion, integrins are known to participate in cell-surface mediated signalling.

Interactions
ITGA2B has been shown to interact with AUP1 and CLNS1A.

See also
 Cluster of differentiation
 Glycoprotein IIb/IIIa

References

Further reading

External links
 
 

Clusters of differentiation
Integrins